Anguo, nicknamed "Medicine Capital", is a county-level city under the administration of and  south of Baoding, central Hebei province, China.

It has a provincially protected Temple of the God of Medicine established around 100.

In premodern China, Anguo was Qizhou. In 1991, Anguo was changed from county into a city. The Chinese playwright Guan Hanqing was born here.

Administrative divisions
Subdistricts:
Qizhouyaoshi Subdistrict

Towns:
Qizhou, Wurenqiao, Shifo, Zhengzhang, Xifoluo, Dawunü

Townships:
Mingguandian Township, Nanloudi Township, Xi'anguocheng Township, Beiduancun Township

Climate

External links

 药都安国 (Anguo, the Medicine Capital). Municipal government website, in Simplified Chinese

 
Geography of Baoding
County-level cities in Hebei